Boudewijn Ernst de Geer (born 24 June 1955) is a Dutch retired professional football player and coach who played for ADO Den Haag, HFC Haarlem, Molde, Lillestrøm, Hércules CF, De Graafschap and Brisbane Lions.

He is the grandson of Dirk Jan de Geer and the father of fellow football player Mike de Geer.

References

External links
  Player profile at Voetbal International
 Player profile at ADO Fan Page 
 

1955 births
Living people
Footballers from The Hague
Association football forwards
Dutch footballers
Dutch football managers
ADO Den Haag players
HFC Haarlem players
Molde FK players
Lillestrøm SK players
De Graafschap players
Hércules CF players
Queensland Lions FC players
Eredivisie players
Eliteserien players
Dutch expatriate footballers
Expatriate footballers in Norway
Expatriate footballers in Spain
Expatriate soccer players in Australia
HBS Craeyenhout football managers